Bengal temple architecture is about temple styles developed and used in Bengal, particularly the chala, ratna and dalan temples.

Background
According to David J. McCutchion, historically the religious architecture in Bengal may be divided into three periods: the early Hindu period (up to the end of the 12th century, or may be a little later in certain areas), the Sultanate period (14th to  early 16th century), the Hindu revival period (16th to 19th century). "The coming of the Muslims at the beginning of the 13th century marked a sharp break with the past. After an initial century of anarchy and consolidation, marked by iconoclastic destruction and militant 'sufi' proselytiising, Hindu chiefs and Muslim overlords settled down to some sort of compromise in a common front against Delhi... Bengal, as we know it today, became an independent entity for the first time. During the following two centuries a distinctive Bengali culture took shape.""Between the earlier and later Hindu periods astonishing religious changes took place in Bengal: the worship of Vishnu gave way to that of Radha-Krishna, of Chamunda to that of Kali; Surya fell entirely out of favour; curious folk cults like that of Dharmaraja or Dakshina Raya arose." Another equally common group of  temples found in Pre-Mughal Bengal are temples with tiered pyramidal tower known as pirha or bhadra deul.During the earlier and later hindu period religious changes took place in Bengal which also brought some changes in the temple architecture. In their places of the other temple styles appeared two entirely new styles- hut style and the pinnacled style.

Chala temple
The ek-bangla or do-chala consists of a hut with two sloping roofs, following the pattern of huts, mostly in East Bengal villages. The stone temple at Garui in Bardhaman district of West Bengal, built in the14th century, has a Bengal hut shaped roof.Two huts, one forming a porch in front and the other being the shrine at the back constitutes the jor-bangla – “Bengal's most distinctive contribution to temple design”.

In West Bengal, the hut roof generally has four sides and the char-chala temple is built on this model. When a miniature is built on the roof, it becomes an at-chala. The char-chala temples started coming up around the 17th century. Apart from the main shrines, nahabatkhana or entrance gateways also have char-chala roof.

Ratna temple
The curved roof of a ratna temple “is surmounted by one or more towers or pinnacles called ratna (jewel). The simplest form has a single central tower (eka-ratna), to which may be added four more at the corners (pancha-ratna)”. The number of towers or pinnacles can be increased up to a maximum of twentyfive. The ratna style came up in the 15th-16th century. Muslim domed temples are very rare, except possibly in Cooch Behar.

“Ratna style temples are the composite type of architecture… The lower part of the temple has all the features of the curved cornices and a short pointed spire crowns the roof and this will be adorned with the introduction of ratnas or kiosks.”

Dalan temple
The flat-roofed (dalan) temples “with their heavy cornices on S-curved brackets they too have a long Indo-Islamic place and temple tradition” and then was influenced by European ideas in the 19th century. It was easier to build. In the long run, this style lost its special identity as religious architecture and got mixed up with domestic architecture. In some temples a dome has been added,

Rekha deul
The traditional rekha deul is predominant in the western districts of Bengal. Some are smooth curvilinear and others are ridged curvilinear. In the smooth type, the sikhara is free of horizontal bars and in ridged type, it is closely ridged with bars. The ratha projections are generally deep and spaced, and sometimes decorated. The crowning amalaka is generally large and flat. There are large and small types of deuls. Many of the very small types dispense with the complicated styling. It went on developing from the late 7th century or early 8th century to around the 12th century, increasing its complexity and height but retaining its basic features.

Old unspecified temples

Grouped temple
Temples of identical style and size are sometimes grouped together. Two identical Shiva temples are called a Jora Shiva temple. Groups of four, six and twelve Shiva temples are quite popular. The most elaborate groups existing have 108 Shiva temples.

References

Sacral architecture
Culture of West Bengal
Buildings and structures in Bangladesh
Hindu temple architecture
Indian architectural styles